Gary Nord (born June 12, 1957) is a former American football player and coach.  Nord was the head football coach as the University of Texas at El Paso (UTEP) from 2000 to 2003, he compiling a record of 14–34.  He led the 2000 UTEP Miners football team to a Western Athletic Conference and a berth in the 2000 Humanitarian Bowl, their first bowl game since 1988, where they lost to the 2000 Boise State Broncos football team

Nord most recently served as offensive coordinator and quarterbacks coach at Purdue University. He was named to the position on December 1, 2008, and was relieved of his duties following the 2012 season.  He also worked an assistant coach at the University of Louisville, the University of Oklahoma, the University of Pittsburgh and Florida Atlantic University.  Nord is a long-time associate of Howard Schnellenberger, having served on his staffs at three different schools.

Nord filed a lawsuit against Purdue due to a fall he suffered in the weight room that was under construction. He missed the final three games of the 2012 season due to a back injury.

Head coaching record

References

1957 births
Living people
American football tight ends
Louisville Cardinals football players
Florida Atlantic Owls football coaches
Louisville Cardinals football coaches
Oklahoma Sooners football coaches
Pittsburgh Panthers football coaches
Purdue Boilermakers football coaches
UTEP Miners football coaches
Sportspeople from Louisville, Kentucky
Players of American football from Louisville, Kentucky